Mark Harris (November 19, 1922 – May 30, 2007) was an American novelist, literary biographer, and educator, remembered for his baseball novels featuring Henry Wiggen, particulary Bang the Drum Slowly. Harris's obituary in The Denver Post calls him "one of that legion of under-the-radar writers who for decades consistently turned out excellent novels and went largely unsung as he did...Harris said of his books that 'they are about the one man against his society and trying to come to terms with his society, and trying to succeed within it without losing his own identity or integrity.' He might have said the same thing of himself."

Biography

Early life
Harris was born Mark Harris Finkelstein in Mount Vernon, New York, to Carlyle and Ruth (Klausner) Finkelstein. At the age of 11, he began keeping a diary, which he would maintain for every day of his life thereafter.

After graduating in 1940 from Mount Vernon High School, he dropped his surname because "it was a difficult time for kids with Jewish names to get jobs." He subsequently went to work for Paul Winkler's Press Alliance news agency in New York City as a messenger and mimeograph operator.

He was drafted into the United States Army in January 1943. His growing opposition to war and his anger at the prevalence of racial discrimination in the Army led him to go AWOL from Camp Wheeler, Georgia, in February 1944. He was soon arrested and then hospitalized for psychoneurosis. He was honorably discharged in April 1944. His wartime experience formed the basis for two of his novels, Trumpet to the World (1946) and Something About a Soldier (1957).

Journalism career
Harris joined The Daily Item of Port Chester, New York, as a reporter in May 1944.  A year later he accepted a position with PM in New York City but was fired after two months. In July 1945 he was hired by the International News Service and moved to St. Louis. While there, he met coworker Josephine Horen, whom he would marry in March 1946. After resigning in July 1946, he spent the next year and a half in a succession of short-lived journalism jobs in Albuquerque, New Mexico (Albuquerque Journal), Chicago (Negro Digest and Ebony), and New York (Park Row News Service).

Academic career
In February 1948, Harris enrolled at the University of Denver, from which he received a Master's degree in English in 1951 as well as obtaining a PhD in American Studies from the University of Minnesota in 1956, writing his doctoral dissertation on the progressive writer and intellectual Randolph Bourne.

After obtaining his doctorate, Harris began a long, productive career as a college educator. In September 1956, he was hired by the English department of San Francisco State College, where he taught until 1967. He went on to teach at several other universities, including Purdue University (1967–1970), California Institute of the Arts (1970–1973), the University of Southern California (1973–1975), and the University of Pittsburgh (1976–1980). In September 1980, he joined the faculty of Arizona State University, where he was a professor of English and taught in the creative writing program until his retirement in 2001.

Writing career
Harris completed his first novel, Trumpet to the World, while employed as a journalist in St. Louis. Published in 1946, Trumpet to the World is the story of a young black soldier married to a white woman who is put on trial for striking back at a white officer. Even while Harris attended school he continued to write fiction, producing three novels by the time he received his Ph.D. He continued to produce novels and contribute to periodicals through the years.

Harris was best known for a quartet of novels about baseball players: The Southpaw (1953), Bang the Drum Slowly (1956), A Ticket for a Seamstitch (1957), and It Looked Like For Ever (1979). Written in the American vernacular, the books are the account of Henry "Author" Wiggen, a pitcher for the fictional New York Mammoths. In 1956, Bang the Drum Slowly was adapted for an installment of the dramatic television anthology series The United States Steel Hour; the production starred Paul Newman as Wiggen and Albert Salmi as doomed catcher Bruce Pearson. The novel also became a major motion picture in 1973, with a screenplay written by Harris, directed by John D. Hancock and featuring Michael Moriarty as Wiggen and Robert De Niro as Pearson. Although Bang the Drum Slowly was Harris's only true popular success, most of his novels have received critical acclaim. These include Something about a Soldier (1957), Wake Up Stupid (1959), The Goy (1970), and Killing Everybody (1973).

In 1960, while in his first college teaching position, at San Francisco State College, Harris promoted his then-most-recent book in a TV appearance as guest contestant in "You Bet Your Life", a game played on The Groucho Show.

In the first chapter of his 1961 classic The Rhetoric of Fiction, Wayne C. Booth quotes the "fine young novelist" Harris as saying: "You will no more expect the novelist to tell you precisely how something is said than you will expect him to stand by your chair and hold your book."

In January 1962, Something About a Soldier, a stage version of Harris's novel, played briefly on Broadway. Written by Ernest Kinoy and produced by the Theatre Guild, it featured Sal Mineo in the lead role. Later, the novel Bang the Drum Slowly was adapted into a stage play at the Next Theatre in Evanston, Illinois.

In addition to his work as a novelist, Harris had a productive career in other literary genres. He authored numerous critical essays and articles, and has edited the poems of Vachel Lindsay (Selected Poems of Vachel Lindsay, 1963) and the journals of James Boswell (Heart of Boswell, 1981). Harris also wrote biographies of Lindsay (City of Discontent, 1952) and Saul Bellow (Saul Bellow: Drumlin Woodchuck, 1980). He has also written three autobiographical books: Mark the Glove Boy, or The Last Days of Richard Nixon (1964), an account of Nixon's unsuccessful California gubernatorial campaign; Twentyone Twice: A Journal (1966), an account of his experiences in Sierra Leone as a member of the Peace Corps; and, finally, Best Father Ever Invented (1976), subtitled "An Autobiography of Mark Harris," in which he chronicles his life from late adolescence up to 1973.

Harris died of complications of Alzheimer's disease at Santa Barbara Cottage Hospital at age 84. He was survived by his wife, Josephine Horen; his sister, Martha; two sons, one daughter, and three grandchildren. His nephew (the son of Harris's sister Martha Finkelstein) is the writer Saïd Sayrafiezadeh, author of the memoir When Skateboards Will Be Free: A Memoir of a Political Childhood. Harris's papers are held in Special Collections at the University of Delaware.

Legacy 
In Baseball: A Literary Anthology, editor Nicholas Dawidoff writes that "The four books in which Wiggen narrates the story of his life in baseball—The Southpaw (1953), Bang the Drum Slowly (1956), A Ticket for a Seamstitch (1957), and It Looked For Ever (1979)—elevate the baseball novel into unmistakable art."

In The Denver Post, Roger K. Miller writes that "Bang the Drum Slowly, by Henry J. Wiggin: Certain of His Enthusiasms Restrained, to give it its full title, is even better than that other much-praised baseball novel, Bernard Malamud's The Natural, with its element of fantasy. (Harris did not like fantasy, especially in baseball.) It is at least as good as Robert Coover's The Universal Baseball Association, Inc., J. Henry Waugh, Prop. which is about a fantasy game and, like Harris' and all other good baseball novels, about something more than baseball.""

Selected works

Novels
Trumpet to the World (1946)
The Southpaw (1953)
Bang the Drum Slowly (1956)
Something about a Soldier (1957)
A Ticket for a Seamstitch (1957)
Wake Up, Stupid (1959)
The Goy (1970)
Killing Everybody (1973)
It Looked Like Forever (1979)
Lying in Bed (1984)
Speed (1990)
The Tale Maker (1994)

Short stories
The Self-Made Brain Surgeon and Other Stories (1999)

Nonfiction
City of Discontent: An Interpretive Biography of Vachel Lindsay (1952)
Mark the Glove Boy, or The Last Days of Richard Nixon (1964)
Twentyone Twice: A Journal (1966)
Best Father Ever Invented: The Autobiography Of Mark Harris (1976)
Short Work of It: Selected Writings (1979)
Saul Bellow: Drumlin Woodchuck (1980)
Diamond – The Baseball Writings of Mark Harris (collection, 1994)

Plays
Friedman & Son (1963)
Bang the Drum Slowly (1992)

Television plays
Boswell for the Defence (1983)
Boswell's London Journal (1984)

Screenplays
Bang the Drum Slowly (1973)

As editor
Selected Poems of Vachel Lindsay (1963)
The Heart of Boswell: Six Journals in One Volume (1981)

References

External links
Mark Harris papers, Special Collections, University of Delaware Library, Newark, Delaware.

1922 births
2007 deaths
Writers from Mount Vernon, New York
Deaths from Alzheimer's disease
American male novelists
American male biographers
Novelists from Arizona
Novelists from New York (state)
University of Denver alumni
University of Minnesota College of Liberal Arts alumni
Arizona State University faculty
People from Tempe, Arizona
University of Minnesota faculty
San Francisco State University faculty
Purdue University faculty
California Institute of the Arts faculty
University of Southern California faculty
University of Pittsburgh faculty
Brandeis University faculty
20th-century American novelists
20th-century American biographers
Novelists from Pennsylvania
Novelists from Indiana
Novelists from Massachusetts
Novelists from Minnesota
20th-century American male writers
Deaths from dementia in California
United States Army personnel of World War II